Xylophanes sarae is a moth of the  family Sphingidae.

Distribution 
It is known from Venezuela.

Description 
The wingspan is 68–86 mm for males and 75–90 mm for females. It is similar to Xylophanes crotonis, but smaller and the upperside of the body and forewings is brownish-green. The forewing upperside is brown with green highlights. Furthermore, the basal black patch on the inner margin is more discrete and prolonged along the basal third of the inner margin by a tuft of whitish-yellow scales.

Biology 
Adults are probably on wing year-round.

The larvae probably feed on Rubiaceae and Malvaceae species.

References

sarae
Moths described in 1989
Endemic fauna of Venezuela
Moths of South America